Nicolás Sánchez González (born 27 May 1997) is an Argentine professional footballer who plays as a midfielder.

Career
Sánchez began in the youth system of Tigre, which preceded a move to All Boys on 3 August 2018; after a three-week trial. Pablo De Muner selected him for his senior debut on matchday three against Sacachispas in Primera B Metropolitana. In the return fixture in the succeeding February, Sánchez netted his opening goal in a 0–2 win for All Boys.

Career statistics
.

References

External links

1997 births
Living people
People from San Isidro Partido
Argentine footballers
Association football midfielders
Primera B Metropolitana players
All Boys footballers
Sportspeople from Buenos Aires Province